Dangerous: The Short Films is a collection of music videos from the Dangerous album by Michael Jackson released initially on VHS, Laser Disc and double Video CD (in Asia market only) in 1993 and reissued on DVD in 2000. It was re-packaged with Dangerous in a two disc set in 2008.

Track listing
 "Intro"
 "Brace Yourself"
 "Reaction to Black or White"
 "Black or White" (original long version w/graffiti)
 "Black or White: Behind the Scenes"
 "Grammy Legend Award 1993"
 "Heal the World" (Super Bowl XXVII halftime version)
 "Remember the Time: Behind the Scenes"
 "Remember the Time"
 "Will You Be There"
 "In the Closet: Behind the Scenes"
 "In the Closet"
 "Ryan White"
 "Gone Too Soon"
 "NAACP Image Awards"
 "Jam: Behind the Scenes"
 "Jam"
 "Introduction to Heal the World"
 "Heal the World"
 "Give In to Me"
 "I'll Be There" (Pepsi commercial)
 "Who Is It"
 "Dangerous: Behind the Scenes" 
 "Dangerous"
 "Credits" (with the music of "Why You Wanna Trip on Me")

Certifications

References

1993 video albums
Michael Jackson video albums
Music video compilation albums